Coulter Field is a multi-purpose stadium at the Bishop's University in Lennoxville, Quebec. It is home to the Bishop's Gaiters rugby, soccer, and football varsity teams. Coulter Field has a fixed seating capacity of 2,200. The field is named for Bruce Coulter, who was the football team's head coach from 1962 to 1990 and is a member of the Canadian Football Hall of Fame.  Coulter Field is also used by the Montreal Alouettes of the Canadian Football League as a practice facility.

References

Soccer venues in Quebec
Sports venues in Sherbrooke
Canadian football venues in Quebec
Multi-purpose stadiums in Quebec